Malcolm Luciano Rodriguez (born March 29, 1999) is an American football linebacker for the Detroit Lions of the National Football League (NFL). He played college football at Oklahoma State.

High school career
Rodriguez attended Wagoner High School in Wagoner, Oklahoma. He played quarterback and defensive back in high school. During his career he had 115 touchdowns with 6,144 passing yards and 2,449 rushing yards.

College career
Rodriguez joined Oklahoma State in 2017 and played there until 2021. After starting his career as a safety he moved to linebacker in 2019.  As a senior he was named a first-team All-American by ESPN. During his career, he had 408 tackles 7.5 sacks, two interceptions, and a touchdown. In his final college game, he was named the MVP of the 2022 Fiesta Bowl.

Professional career

Rodriguez was selected by the Detroit Lions with the 188th pick in the sixth round of the 2022 NFL Draft.

References

External links
 Detroit Lions bio
Oklahoma State Cowboys bio

1999 births
Living people
People from Tahlequah, Oklahoma
Players of American football from Oklahoma
American football linebackers
Oklahoma State Cowboys football players
Detroit Lions players